Pseudancistrus kayabi is a species of catfish in the family Loricariidae. It is native to South America, where it occurs in the Teles Pires River, which is part of the Tapajós basin in the state of Mato Grosso in Brazil. The species reaches 8.8 cm (3.5 inches) SL. Its specific epithet, kayabi, refers to the Kayabí people who historically inhabited the region surrounding the Teles Pires, Arinos, and Dos Peixes river basins in Mato Grosso. It was described in 2015 by Gabriel S. C. Silva, Fábio F. Roxo, and Claudio Oliveira alongside the related species Pseudancistrus asurini from the Xingu River basin.

References 

Ancistrini
Fish of Brazil
Fish described in 2015